Preethisi Nodu is a 1981 Indian Kannada-language film, directed by Geethapriya and produced by M. K. Balaji Singh, N. Summary and Indira Srinath. The film stars Vishnuvardhan, Aarathi and Srinivasa Murthy. The film has musical score by Vijaya Bhaskar.

Cast

Vishnuvardhan
Aarathi
Srinivasa Murthy
Jai Jagadish in Guest Appearance
Master Naveen
Baby Rekha
Suneetha

Soundtrack
The music was composed by Vijayabhaskar.

References

External links
 
 

1981 films
1980s Kannada-language films
Films scored by Vijaya Bhaskar
Films based on Indian novels
Films directed by Geethapriya